Penangunni is a 2013 Malayalam 3D film directed by Manoj Chandrasekharan, starring child actors Abhijith Sanal and Vaishnavi in the lead roles. Based on the poem Penangunni by Kureepuzha Sreekumar, which itself won the Balasahithya Award from the Kerala Sahithya Academy in 2003, The film was released 2 August 2013.

Synopsis
The film presents a cinematic journey through the literary lands of Kerala (Malayalam) in order to examine and understand its heritage.

Two orphans are in search of their lost parrot. The parrot represents the lost mother tongue, Malayalam. It is through exploration of the various landmarks and milestones of the language, that the children make their journey to find their pet.

Cast
 Abhijith Sanal as Penangunni
 Vaishnavi as Amminikkutty

Release

Audio
The film's audio tracks were released 11 April 2012 at KV Pattom.

References

External links
 'പെണങ്ങുണ്ണി' - ആദ്യ അനിമേഷന്‍ ചലച്ചിത്രം
 പെണങ്ങുണ്ണി  ഒരുങ്ങുന്നു
 ഗൃഹാതുരതയെ തൊട്ടുണര്‍ത്തി പെണങ്ങുണ്ണി പ്രദര്‍ശനത്തിന്

2013 films
2010s Malayalam-language films
2013 3D films
Indian 3D films